Lee Jesse Gamble (September 15, 1910 – October 5, 1994) was a professional baseball player. He was an outfielder over parts of four seasons (1935, 1938–40) with the Cincinnati Reds. For his career, he compiled a .266 batting average in 342 at-bats, with 21 runs batted in. He made only one error in 135 total chances in 77 games at the outfield for a .993 fielding percentage.

He was born in Renovo, Pennsylvania and later died in Punxsutawney, Pennsylvania at the age of 84.

External links

1910 births
1994 deaths
Cincinnati Reds players
Major League Baseball outfielders
Baseball players from Pennsylvania
Minor league baseball managers
Asheville Tourists players
Macon Peaches players
Fort Worth Cats players
Waterloo Reds players
Syracuse Chiefs players
Birmingham Barons players
Toronto Maple Leafs (International League) players
Reidsville Luckies players